The 2019 North Carolina FC season was the club's 13th season of existence. The 2018 season was the club's first in the USL, having left the NASL at the end of the 2017 season. For the fourth time in history and the first time since 2009, North Carolina won the 2018 Southern Derby, a fan-based U.S. professional soccer cup competition between North Carolina, Charleston Battery, and Charlotte Independence. North Carolina finished the regular season in 9th place with 47 points, missing out on the playoffs by 2 points to Nashville. The 2019 season was the first under new coach Dave Sarachan who replaced Colin Clarke.

Club

Coaching staff

Roster

Competitions

Friendlies

USL Championship

Standings

Results by round

Matches

Playoffs

U.S. Open Cup 

As a member of the USL Championship, North Carolina FC entered the tournament in the second round.

Schedule Source

Squad statistics
Source: Match reports

Appearances and goals

|-
|}

Goal scorers

Disciplinary record

References 

2019
North Carolina Football Club
North Carolina Football Club
North Carolina FC